The Newcomers was a series of seven hour-long Canadian television specials that aired from 1977 to 1980 on CBC Television. These dramas explored the theme of Canada as a nation built by immigrants, spanning from the era before Canada was founded until modern times. The series was sponsored by Imperial Oil to mark the company's 100th anniversary in 1980. The series was produced by Nielsen-Ferns. McClelland and Stewart published a related book in 1979.

A French version aired on Radio-Canada with the title Les Arrivants.

The opening theme music for the series was composed by Hagood Hardy.

Episodes 

All seven episodes were re-aired between 12 March and 2 April 1980.

References

External links
 

1970s Canadian drama television series
CBC Television original programming
Works by Timothy Findley
1977 Canadian television series debuts
1980 Canadian television series endings